Ernesto Vázquez may refer to:

 Ernesto Vázquez (footballer) (born 1989), Mexican footballer
 Ernesto Vázquez (tennis) (born 1953), Spanish tennis player